The 2021 Indian Super League Final was the final match of the 2020–21 Indian Super League season, the seventh season of the Indian Super League. It was played on 13 March 2021 at the Fatorda Stadium, Goa, between Mumbai City FC and ATK Mohun Bagan, who finished first and second in the league table during the regular season respectively.

Owing to COVID-19 pandemic in India the final was played behind closed doors as well as the every match of the regular season and play-offs.

Background
Mumbai City entered the final as the premiers of the regular season, having edged out ATK Mohun Bagan on head-to-head record with a 2–0 win on the final matchday after the teams finished level on points. It was Mumbai City's first final, having previously lost in the semi-finals in the 2016 and 2018–19 seasons. Mumbai City defeated FC Goa in the semi-finals in a penalty-shootout after the two finished 2–2 over aggregate.

ATK Mohun Bagan also competed in the final for the first time, after they were formed prior to the season from a merger between the Kolkata clubs ATK and Mohun Bagan. ATK was the defending Indian Super League champions having defeated Chennaiyin in the final in 2020. ATK Mohun Bagan reached the final, having seen off third-place NorthEast United, by an aggregate score of 3–2 in their semi-final clash.

Match

References

External links
 Indian Super League Official Website.

Indian Super League finals
2020–21 Indian Super League season
2020–21 in Indian football
Indian Super League Final
ATK Mohun Bagan FC matches
Mumbai City FC matches